Relations between Portugal and Thailand date as far as the 16th century. Portugal was the first European nation to make contact with the Ayutthaya Kingdom, in 1511. The Portuguese became dominant foreign traders, and established a presence in the capital. Portuguese traders introduced firearms as well as New-World goods from the Columbian Exchange, influencing Thai cuisine, language and culture. Although Portugal's overseas influence gradually declined from the 17th century, it maintained ties with Siam. The Portuguese Embassy in Bangkok, established in 1820, is the oldest diplomatic mission in the country. In contrast to other European powers, against whose colonial aspirations Siam struggled during the 19th century, Siam's relationship with Portugal was largely friendly. Both countries elevated their missions to embassy status in 1964, and Thailand established a resident embassy in Lisbon in 1981. Today, the two countries share a small amount of trade, tourism and cultural activities.

History
Portugal was the first European nation to make contact with Siam, in 1511 during the Ayutthaya period. Many Portuguese settlers became mercenaries of the Ayutthaya Kingdom. In 1538 during the reign of King Chairacha 120 Portuguese soldiers marched with the King on campaign against his enemies and were rewarded commercial privileges and living quarters in Ayutthaya.

Portuguese diaspora in Thailand
Portuguese settlers formed a large community in Ayutthaya, where an extensive Portuguese quarter was established south of the city. Following the fall of Ayutthaya in 1767, the Portuguese regathered at three locations in Bangkok: around the Immaculate Conception Church in the Samsen area, Santa Cruz Church in Kudi Chin, and Holy Rosary Church in Talat Noi. Their descendants have gradually assimilated into Thai society, though the community, especially at Kudi Chin, still retains a distinctive identity.

See also 
 Foreign relations of Portugal
 Foreign relations of Thailand

References

 
Thailand
Bilateral relations of Thailand